Donner Pass is a  mountain pass in the northern Sierra Nevada, above Donner Lake and Donner Memorial State Park about  west of Truckee, California. Like the Sierra Nevada themselves, the pass has a steep approach from the east and a gradual approach from the west.

The pass has been used by the California Trail, First transcontinental railroad, Overland Route, Lincoln Highway and Victory Highway (both later U.S. Route 40 and still later Donner Pass Road), as well as indirectly by Interstate 80. The pass gets its name from the ill-fated Donner Party who overwintered there in 1846.

Today the area is home to a thriving recreational community with several alpine lakes and ski resorts (Donner Ski Ranch, Boreal, and Sugar Bowl). The permanent communities in the area include Kingvale and Soda Springs, as well as the larger community below the pass surrounding Donner Lake.

History
To reach California from the east, pioneers had to get their wagons over the Sierra Nevada mountain range. In 1844 the Stephens-Townsend-Murphy Party followed the Truckee River into the mountains.  At the head of what is now called Donner Lake, they found a low notch in the mountains and became the first overland settlers to use the pass. The pass was named after a later group of California-bound settlers. In early November 1846 the Donner Party found the route blocked by snow and was forced to spend the winter on the east side of the mountains. Of the 81 settlers, only 45 survived to reach California; some of them resorting to cannibalism to survive.

Southern Pacific Railroad's passenger train City of San Francisco was en route westbound through the gap when a blizzard dumped so much snow the train was unable to move forward or reverse. The passengers and crew were stranded for three days until the nearby highway could be plowed sufficiently for a caravan of automobiles to carry them the few miles to Nyack Lodge.

Central Pacific Railroad

In the spring of 1868, the Sierra Nevada were finally "conquered" by the mainly Chinese laborers of the Central Pacific Railroad (CPRR), after almost three years of sustained drilling and blasting through granite, with the successful completion at Donner Pass of its 1,659-foot (506 m) Tunnel #6 (a.k.a. the Summit Tunnel) and associated grade, thus permitting the establishment of commercial transportation en masse of passengers and freight over the Sierra for the first time. Following a route first surveyed and proposed by CPRR's original Chief Engineer, Theodore D. Judah (1826–1863), the construction of the four tunnels, several miles of snowsheds, and a hand-crafted stone retaining wall 75-foot tall (a.k.a. Chinese or China Wall in recognition of the Chinese builders) necessary to breach Donner Summit constituted the most difficult engineering and construction challenge of the original Sacramento–Ogden CPRR route.
   

Principally designed and built under the personal, often on-site direction of CPRR's Chief Assistant Engineer, Lewis M. Clement (1837–1914), the original (Track 1) summit grade remained in daily use from June 18, 1868, when the first CPRR passenger train ran through the Summit Tunnel, until 1993 when the Southern Pacific Railroad (SP) (which operated the CPRR-built Oakland-Ogden line until its 1996 merger with the Union Pacific Railroad (UP)) abandoned the 6.7 mile (10.7 km) section of Track #1 over the summit running between the Norden complex (Shed 26, MP 192.1) and the covered crossovers in Shed #47 (MP 198.8), one mile east of the old flyover at Eder. SP made this change because the railroad considered Track 2 and Tunnel 41 (which was opened in 1925 when the summit section of the grade was finally double tracked) to be easier and less expensive to maintain during the harsh Sierra winters than the Track 1 tunnels and snow sheds over the summit.

In conjunction with major ongoing upgrades and expansions being made to the Port of Oakland in order to better accommodate the rapidly growing North American trade with Asia and the Pacific, the cooperation of UP, the Port's principal rail partner, has been sought to "construct a second track and raise tunnel clearances over Donner Pass for container trains linking California with the rest of the country." This would likely require either a new parallel tunnel next to Tunnel 41 or the replacement of the summit section of Track 1 between the Norden complex and Shed 47; either would increase capacity and effectively eliminate delays currently caused by having to run all east and west bound traffic between Norden and Shed 47 over a single track. (To eliminate bottleneck delays the now single track  section between Switch 9 (MP 171.9) at Emigrant Gap and Shed 10 (MP 179.0) west of Cisco would likely also have to be restored to double track.) Improvements were completed on the Sierra grade in November 2009, including increasing  of tunnel clearances in 15 restricted tunnels between Rocklin and Truckee and upgrading  of signals to CTC, although the original Donner Pass grade (Track 1) was not restored.

Highways

The Lincoln Highway, the first road across America, crosses Donner Pass; this was also a part of the Victory Highway. Interstate 80 was built through this area in the early 1960s. Donner Summit is about  higher than Donner Pass, but is wider and has a gentler approach that aided construction to Interstate Highway standards, which do not allow the sharp curves used by the Donner Pass Road. The 1920s highway has been preserved as a scenic alternative to I-80.

Weather
Winter weather at Donner Pass can be brutal. Four times since 1880 total snowfall at Donner Summit has exceeded  and topped  in both 1938 and 1952. To take advantage of the heavy snows, the Boreal Ski Resort was built to the north.

The winter of 1846–47 was especially severe, contributing immensely to the disaster of the Donner Party.

Recreation

Sporting activities in the area include backpacking, alpine and cross-country skiing, rock and ice climbing. The original tunnel built by Central Pacific Railroad is home to a large amount of tagging.  The region was featured during the early 1990s in snowboarding films by Fall Line Films (FLF) and Standard Films for its easy access to frontcountry and backcountry terrain.   However, its fame and quick access from Old Highway 40 or nearby Sugar Bowl Ski Resort has led to a large number of avalanche fatalities, including that of professional snowboarder Jamil Khan.

Popular culture
1994 American Western Comedy Wagons East features James Harlow (John Candy), as the disgraced former wagon master for the Donner Party.

Albert Bierstadt's painting View of Donner Lake (1871–72) shows the view of the titular lake from the vicinity of the pass.

Jack Torrance tells his family the story of the Donner Party while driving through the pass in The Shining.

Donner Pass is featured in the History Channel special episode, America: The Story of Us: "Westward". It is also featured in the National Geographic Channel series Hell on the Highway, which focuses on the towing and recovery companies working the region.

References

External links

 Central Pacific Railroad Photographic History Museum
 360° QTVR Panorama #2 Above Tunnel #7 Central Pacific Railroad Photographic History Museum
 Fremont's 1845 descent from the Pass Longcamp.com
 Sierra Grade Exhibit – Donner Pass Central Pacific Railroad Photographic History Museum
 Southern Pacific's City of San Francisco Stranded (1952) Central Pacific Railroad Photographic History Museum
 CalTrans webcam at Donner Summit

Donner Party
Landforms of Nevada County, California
Lincoln Highway
Mountain passes of the Sierra Nevada (United States)
Rail mountain passes of the United States
Southern Pacific Railroad
Stephens–Townsend–Murphy Party
Transportation in Nevada County, California